The 2007 O'Byrne Cup was a Gaelic football competition played by the teams of Leinster GAA. The competition differs from the Leinster Senior Football Championship as it also features further education colleges.

O'Byrne Cup

First round
The first round saw the withdrawal of Kilkenny who were then replaced by Dundalk IT. Dundalk IT later dropped out of the competition which means that Wexford go on to play in the Quarter-final on January 4, 2007. The first match of the O'Byrne Cup was played between Carlow and Wicklow. It was a much anticipated game as it was the debut of the new Wicklow senior football manager Mick O'Dwyer. Wexford, Wicklow, DIT, Offaly, Laois, Louth, Westmeath and Dublin went on to play in the quarter finals of the O'Byrne Cup. The teams that exited in the first round were Carlow, Longford, UCD, Kildare, Meath, Athlone IT, and DCU who went on to play in the O'Byrne Shield. Dundalk IT did not continue to the O'Byrne Shield as they dropped out of the competition at the O'Byrne Cup first round stage.

Quarter-finals
The teams that went on to the Semi-final stage of the competition are Wicklow, Dublin, Offaly, Laois. The teams that exited at the quarter final stage are Wexford, Westmeath, DIT, Louth. Unlike, the teams in the first round, the losing teams did not go on to play in the O'Byrne Shield, their loss means that they no longer took part in any O'Byrne competition in 2007.

Semi-finals

Final

O'Byrne Shield

Quarter-finals
The O'Byrne Shield involves the losing sides from the O'Byrne Cup. The quarter finals involved Longford, UCD, Meath, Kildare, Athlone IT, DCU, Dundalk IT and Carlow. Longford and Kildare qualified for the Semi-finals by beating their respective opponents. Dundalk IT did not continue after dropping out of the O'Byrne Cup as replacements for Kilkenny, therefore their expected opponents Carlow qualified directly for the Shield semi final. DCU withdrew from the competition, conceding to Athlone IT and therefore Athlone IT continued to the semi without kicking a ball.

Semi-finals
In the semi-finals, Longford defeated Kildare by a point in spite of having been reduced to 14 players before half time when their midfielder Liam Keenan was sent off for a second yellow card offence, while Athlone IT caused a surprise by beating Carlow by three points.

Final

See also
 2007 Dr McKenna Cup

External links
2007 O'Byrne Cup to be Televised

O'Byrne Cup
O'Byrne Cup